On Ice is the debut album by Norwegian pop singer Bambee, released in 1999 (see 1999 in music). The track "Bumble Bee" was featured in the video game Dance Dance Revolution 3rdMIX and Dance Dance Revolution 4thMIX. "Bumble Bee" also appeared in the video game In The Groove 2 along with "Baby Baby" and "Typical Tropical." "Typical Tropical" has also appeared in Dance Dance Revolution Solo 2000.

Track listing

References

Bambee albums